Yên Mỹ may refer to:

Yên Mỹ District, Vietnam
Yên Mỹ, Bắc Giang, Vietnam
Yên Mỹ, Bắc Kạn, Vietnam